Belafonte Concert in Japan is a live album by Harry Belafonte, released in 1974. The album was Belafonte's final release for RCA Records, concluding a 21-year association with the label.

Track listing 
 "Roll on Buddy" (Traditional) – 2:56  
 "Old Time Feeling" (Guy Clark) – 5:43  
 "John Henry" (Traditional) – 3:57  
 "We Had It All " (Guy Clark) – 3:52  
 "Empty Chairs" (Don McLean) – 5:32  
 "Mr. Bojangles" (Jerry Jeff Walker) – 6:01  
 "Marching To the Fair" (Morris Goldberg, Shunmugan Pillay) – 5:26  
 "Erene" (Georges Petsilas) – 3:56  
 "Carnival Medley: – 16:00
 "Don't Stop the Carnival"
 "Jean and Dinah" (Mighty Sparrow, Slinger Francisco)
 "Mama Looka Boo Boo" (Fitzroy Alexander)
 "Jump in the Line" (Stephen Somvel)
 "Marianne" (William Eaton)
 "Sly Mongoose"
 "Zombie Jamboree"
 "Man Piaba" (Harry Belafonte, Jack K. Rollins)
 "Jamaica Farewell" (Lord Burgess) – 4:25
 "Sakura" (Traditional, Marilyn Keith, Alan Bergman) – 3:42
 "Day-O (Banana Boat Song)" (William Attaway, Harry Belafonte) – 2:40  
 "Matilda" – 5:22
Don't Stop The Carnival" -5:03

Personnel 
 Harry Belafonte – vocals
 Sivuca – piano, accordion, guitar, organ
 Mervin Bronson – bass
 Scott Kuney – guitar, koto, bouzouki
 William Fontaine – guitar
 Michael Tobas – drums
 Angel Allende – percussion
 Falumi Prince – vocals, percussion
 Diane Greene – background vocals
 Barbara Young – background vocals
 Patricia Rosalia – background vocals
 Arthur Williams – background vocals
 Clark Salonis – background vocals
 Michael Sabbarese – background vocals
Production notes:
 John Cartwright – musical director, conductor
 Hideo Komuro  – recording director
 Eiji Uchinuma – engineer, mixing

References 

Harry Belafonte live albums
1974 live albums
RCA Records live albums